Lord Forbes of Pitsligo was a title in the Peerage of Scotland. It was created on 24 June 1633 for Alexander Forbes. He was a descendant of Sir William Forbes, brother of Alexander Forbes, 1st Lord Forbes (see the Lord Forbes). In 1746, the fourth Lord was attainted for his involvement in the Jacobite rising of 1745, with the lordship forfeited.

The seat of the Lords Forbes of Pitsligo was Pitsligo Castle in Aberdeenshire.

Lords Forbes of Pitsligo (1633)
Alexander Forbes, 1st Lord Forbes of Pitsligo (d. 1636)
Alexander Forbes, 2nd Lord Forbes of Pitsligo (d. c.1662)
Alexander Forbes, 3rd Lord Forbes of Pitsligo (c.1655–1690)
Alexander Forbes, 4th Lord Forbes of Pitsligo (d. 1762) (forfeit 1746)

See also
Lord Forbes
Forbes baronets
Clan Forbes

References
Kidd, Charles, Williamson, David (editors). Debrett's Peerage and Baronetage (1990 edition). New York: St Martin's Press, 1990.

Forfeited lordships of Parliament
Noble titles created in 1633